John McCain was the Republican Party candidate for President of the United States in 2008. Rick Davis, his campaign manager, projected at one point that his staff would eventually increase to about 450. By early July 2008, it had opened 11 regional offices in key states and some 84 offices total across the country in a joint effort with the Republican National Committee.

National leadership team
Persons listed on the John McCain for President website:
 Former Secretary of Commerce Robert Mosbacher – Chairman
 Frederic V. Malek – Finance Director
 Jill Hazelbaker – Spokeswoman

Inner circle
According to New York Times reporter John M. Broder:
 Steve Schmidt, head of campaign from July 2, 2008, veteran campaign manager
 Rick Davis, ran McCain's 2000 campaign
 Bill McInturff, chief pollster
 Mark Salter, McCain's Senate chief of staff
 John Weaver, chief political analyst (left campaign in 2007)
 Trevor Potter, chief counsel
Others joining later or listed in other sources include:
 Charles R. Black, Jr., senior political adviser
 Carly Fiorina, former CEO of Hewlett Packard

The Bush team
 Wayne L. Berman, lobbyist and Bush fund-raiser
 Mark McKinnon, Bush's media consultant
 Terry Nelson, Bush's political director 2004 campaign
 Gerald L. Parsky, California chairman, Bush's 2000 and 2004 campaigns
 Nicolle Wallace, née Nicolle Devenish, White House communications director
 Ron Weiser, Ambassador to Slovakia and Bush fund-raiser

Policy advisers
 Dan L. Crippen, director, Congressional Budget Office 1999–2003
 Douglas Holtz-Eakin, director, Congressional Budget Office 2003–2005
 Kevin Hassett, economist, American Enterprise Institute
 Lisa Graham Keegan, Arizona education official
 John Thain, CEO, Merrill Lynch

Foreign policy advisers
In October 2007, the Washington Post listed the following as McCain's foreign policy advisers.
 Randy Scheunemann, national security aide to then-Senate Majority Leaders Bob Dole and Trent Lott and now a lobbyist, defense and foreign policy coordinator (for this cycle and 2000)"
 Richard L. Armitage, "President George W. Bush’s deputy secretary of state and an international business consultant and lobbyist, informal foreign policy adviser"; [24] deputy to former secretary of state Colin Powell
 Bernard Aronson, former Assistant Secretary of State for Inter-American affairs; currently managing partner of private equity investment company ACON Investments
 William L. Ball III, Secretary of the Navy during President Reagan’s administration, and managing director of lobbying firm the Loeffler Group
 Stephen E. Biegun, Aspen Strategy Group, Council on Foreign Relations, Council of the Americas, former national security aide to then-Sen. Bill Frist, currently VP international affairs, Ford Motors
 Steven Bogden, speechwriter 
 Max Boot, Council on Foreign Relations, former Wall Street Journal editor
 Brig. Gen. Tom Bruner
 Lorne W. Craner
 Lawrence Eagleburger, Secretary of State under George H. W. Bush, now a senior public policy adviser with law firm Baker Donelson
 Brig. Gen. Russ Eggers
 Maj. Gen. Merrill Evans
 Niall Ferguson, Harvard historian and Hoover Institution senior fellow
 Michael J. Green, former Asia adviser to President George W. Bush and now Japan chair at the Center for Strategic and International Studies
 Gen. Alexander M. Haig, Jr., Secretary of State under Reagan
 Maj. Gen. Evan "Curly" Hultman
 Robert Kagan, senior associate with the Carnegie Endowment for International Peace
 Brig. Gen. Robert Michael Kimmitt, current deputy Treasury secretary
 Henry A. Kissinger, Secretary of State under Richard Nixon
 Col. Andrew F. Krepinevich, President of the Center for Strategic and Budgetary Assessments
 William Kristol, editor, The Weekly Standard
 Adm. Charles Larson
 Robert McFarlane, National Security Adviser under Ronald Reagan
 Brig. Gen. Warren "Bud" Nelson
 Brig. Gen. Eddie Newman
 Maj. Gen. John Peppers
 Maj. Ralph Peters
 Brig. Gen. Maurice Phillips
 Gen. Colin Powell, Secretary of State (2001–2005)
 Kori Schake Research fellow at Stanford University's Hoover Institution
 James R. Schlesinger, "President Nixon and President Ford’s secretary of defense, energy and national security adviser"[24]
 Gary Schmitt, former staff director of the Senate Intelligence Committee, currently American Enterprise Institute scholar
 Lt. Gen. Brent Scowcroft, National Security Adviser to Presidents Ford and George H. W. Bush and founder of business consultancy the Scowcroft Group
 George P. Shultz, Secretary of State under Ronald Reagan
 Brig. Gen. W.L. "Bill" Wallace
 Maj. Gen. Gary Wattnem
 R. James Woolsey, former CIA director, now a VP at Booz Allen Hamilton
Other advisers:
 Lisa Curtis

Economic policy advisers
From a July 12, 2007 press release:

 Grant Aldonas — Managing Director for Split Rock International; former Undersecretary for International Trade at the U.S. Department of Commerce
 Carlos Bonilla — Senior Vice President for The Washington Group; former Special Assistant To President George W. Bush; a lobbyist
 Jeff Brown — Associate Professor of Finance at the College of Business, University of Illinois at Urbana-Champaign
 Juan Buttari — Independent consultant and researcher In development economics
 Kathleen Bell Cooper — Dean, College of Business, University of North Texas
 Steve Davis — CRA International and University of Chicago Graduate School of Business
 Richard Dekaser — Senior VP and Chief Economist, National City Corporation
 John Diamond — Edward A. and Hermena Hancock Kelly Fellow in Tax Policy, Baker Institute of Public Policy, Rice University
 Emil Frankel — Transportation Consultant and Former Assistant Secretary for Transportation Policy, Department of Transportation
 Luke Froeb — Professor, Vanderbilt University
 Kevin Hassett — Resident Scholar and Director of Economic Policy Studies, American Enterprise Institute (AEI)
 Greg Jenner — former Executive Vice President, American Council of Life Insurers and Acting Assistant Secretary (Tax Policy), U.S. Treasury Department
 David John — Senior Research Fellow, Heritage Foundation
 Tim Kane — Director, Center for International Trade and Economics, Heritage Foundation
 Melissa Kearney — Assistant Professor of Economics, University of Maryland, College Park
 Anne Krueger — Professor at The Johns Hopkins School of Advanced International Studies (SAIS) and Former First Deputy Managing Director at the International Monetary Fund
 Adam Lerrick — Visiting Scholar for the American Enterprise Institute (AEI) and Friends of Allan H. Meltzer Professor of Economics for Carnegie Mellon
 Phil Levy — Resident Scholar for the American Enterprise Institute (AEI) and Former Senior Economist for Trade on the President's Council of Economic Advisers
 Will Melick — Gensemer Associate Professor of Economics, Kenyon College
 Michael Owen Moore — Professor of Economics and International Affairs, George Washington University
 Thomas P. Miller — Resident Fellow for American Enterprise Institute (AEI)
 Tim Muris — Foundation Professor, George Mason University School of Law
 Gerry Parsky — Senior Economic Adviser
 Nancy Pfotenhauer — Former President, Independent Women's Forum
 James Rill — Partner, Howrey LLP and Former Assistant Attorney General (Antitrust), U.S. Department of Justice
 Kenneth Rogoff — Professor of Public Policy, Harvard University
 Harvey S. Rosen — Professor of Economics and Business Policy, Princeton University
 John Silvia — Managing Director, Chief Economist, Wachovia Bank
 Acquiles Suarez — Vice President for Government Affairs for National Association of Industrial and Office Properties and former Special Assistant to the President for Domestic Policy
 John Taylor — Professor of Economics at Stanford, Senior Fellow at the Hoover Institution and Former Under Secretary of Treasury
 Anthony Villamil Chief Executive Officer, The Washington Economics Group and Former Under Secretary of Commerce for Economic Affairs
 Joseph Wright — Chairman of the Board of Intelsat
 Mark Zandi — Chief Economist for Moody's Analytics (formerly known as Moody's Economy.Com)
 James Rill — Antitrust attorney at Howrey LLP; Former Assistant Attorney General in charge of the U.S. Department of Justice's Antitrust Division
 Sean O'Keefe — former Secretary of the Navy, NASA Administrator, and Deputy Director of Office of Management and Budget, The White House
 Matthew Lockwood — Director of Contributions Processed

National Campaign co-chairs
 John Chambers, California
 Gov. Jon Huntsman, Utah
 Gov. Tim Pawlenty, Minnesota
 Former Gov. Tom Ridge, Pennsylvania
 Former Senator Warren Rudman, New Hampshire
 Frederick W. Smith, Tennessee
 Charlie Condon, South Carolina

National Finance Committee co-chairs
 Former Rep. George Argyros, California
 Michael Ashner, New York
 Brian Ballard, Florida (lobbyist) 
 Lawrence E. Bathgate II, New Jersey
 Wayne Berman, Washington, D.C.
 Donald L. Bren, California
 John Chambers, California
 James A. Courter, New Jersey
 Donald R. Diamond, Arizona
 Ray Dalio, Connecticut
 Lewis M. Eisenberg, New Jersey
 Jon Hammes, Wisconsin
 James B. Lee, Jr., New York
 John A. Moran, Florida
 Carter Pate, Virginia
 A. Jerrold Perenchio, California
 Fred Smith, Tennessee
 J. Gary Shansby, California
 John Thain of Merrill Lynch; New York
 Ronald Weiser, Michigan

Former members
 Senator Phil Gramm – General Co-chair, resigned July 18 after remarks calling Americans "whiners"
 Robert Zoellick
 Tom Loeffler
 Susan E. Nelson, "continued to collect payments from [the Loeffler Group] this year while she was on the McCain-campaign payroll as its fund-raising coordinator" The Loeffler Group is a lobbying firm that has "received $990,000 in lobbying fees and another $3,000 in expenses from the Saudi government".
 Mark McKinnon, citing a pledge not to work against an Obama candidacy.
 Doug Davenport and Doug Goodyear of the DCI Group resigned on May 10, 2008, after revelation of DCI's ties to the military junta in Myanmar. Davenport, the regional campaign manager for the mid-Atlantic states, founded the DCI Group's lobbying practice and oversaw the contract with Myanmar in 2002. Goodyear was asked to become convention CEO after campaign manager Rick Davis's lobbying firm partner, Paul Manafort, was nixed because of his own close ties to foreign governments and controversial companies
 Carlos Bonilla, economic policy adviser. Left in May 2008 after the campaign imposed new rules restricting the involvement of lobbyists.
 Michael P. Dennehy, national political director and founder of the political consulting and lobbying firm The Dennehy Group. Left in May 2007 explaining that his family obligations conflicted with his arduous, 24/7 political job in Washington, D.C.

See also 
 List of Barack Obama presidential campaign staff members, 2008

References 

2008-related lists
Staff members
Lists of presidential campaign staff members
McCain, John presidential campaign staff members
Lists of United States presidential candidate endorsements